Es Castell is a small municipality in eastern Menorca in the Balearic Islands, Spain. The town was founded in 1771 by British Col. Patrick Mackellar and was originally called Georgetown in honour of King George III; however, it takes its current name from the large fort nearby, known to the British as St. Philip's Castle. Col. Patrick MacKellar (Argyllshire 1717-1778) was the chief engineer of Menorca and his house today is known as Son Granot. Es Castell celebrates its Foundation Day  on 1 June with 18th-century themed festivities, in which the Municipality itself, St. Philip's Castle Foundation, Son Granot and other institutions participate.

Gallery

References

External links
Ajuntament des Castell

Municipalities in Menorca
Populated places in Menorca